Wassen is a municipality in the canton of Uri in Switzerland.

Geography

Of this area, 12.5% is used for agricultural purposes, while 18.2% is forested. Of the rest of the land, 1.1% is settled (buildings or roads) and the remainder (68.1%) is non-productive (rivers, glaciers or mountains). , 9.6% of the total land area was heavily forested, while 6.8% is covered in small trees and shrubbery. Of the agricultural land, 2.5% is used for orchards or vine crops and 10.1% is used for alpine pastures. Of the settled areas, 0.2% is covered with buildings, and 0.8% is transportation infrastructure. Of the unproductive areas, 0.1% is unproductive standing water (ponds or lakes), 1.2% is unproductive flowing water (rivers), 48.5% is too rocky for vegetation, and 18.3% is other unproductive land.

It is on the Gotthard line and the rail line makes a double loop near Wassen to help the trains deal with the climb. The Susten Pass connects Wassen with Innertkirchen.

Sights
The Gottardo-Weitwanderweg (long-distance hiking trail) between Erstfeld and Biasca was opened for the 125th anniversary of the Gotthard Railway. Panels at over 50 places, including Wassen, provide information on the Gotthard Region and its railway. The Schöllenen Gorge is a gorge, over which, according to legend, a bridge could only be built with the help of the devil. It is the second largest crystal cave in Switzerland and has provided large quantities of mountain crystals for centuries. Accessible with a guide.

Demographics

, 7.2% of the population was made up of foreign nationals. Over the last 10 years the population has decreased at a rate of -16%. Most of the population speaks German  (94.2%), with Serbo-Croatian being second most common (2.4%) and Italian being third (1.3%).   the gender distribution of the population was 51.8% male and 48.2% female.

In the 2007 federal election the FDP party received 85.9% of the vote.

In Wassen about 53% of the population (between age 25–64) have completed either non-mandatory upper secondary education or additional higher education (either university or a Fachhochschule).

Wassen has an unemployment rate of 0.64%.  , there were 43 people employed in the primary economic sector and about 18 businesses involved in this sector.  34 people are employed in the secondary sector and there are 7 businesses in this sector.  121 people are employed in the tertiary sector, with 18 businesses in this sector.

The historical population is given in the following table:

References

Municipalities of the canton of Uri